The Tafel equation is an equation in electrochemical kinetics relating the rate of an electrochemical reaction to the overpotential.  The Tafel equation was first deduced experimentally and was later shown to have a theoretical justification. The equation is named after Swiss chemist Julius Tafel." It describes how the electrical current through an electrode depends on the voltage difference between the electrode and the bulk electrolyte for a simple, unimolecular redox reaction ".

Where an electrochemical reaction occurs in two half reactions on separate electrodes, the Tafel equation is applied to each electrode separately. On a single electrode the Tafel equation can be stated as:

where
 the plus sign under the exponent refers to an anodic reaction, and a minus sign to a cathodic reaction,
 : overpotential, V
  : "Tafel slope", V
  : current density, A/m2
 : "exchange current density", A/m2.

A verification plus further explanation for this equation can be found here. "[ The Tafel equation ] assumes that the concentrations at the electrode are practically equal to the concentrations in the bulk electrolyte, allowing the current to be expressed as a function of potential only. In other words, it assumes that the electrode mass transfer rate is much greater than the reaction rate, and that the reaction is dominated by the slower chemical reaction rate ". Also, at a given electrode the Tafel equation assumes that the reverse half reaction rate is negligible compared to the forward reaction rate.

Overview of the terms
The exchange current is the current at equilibrium, i.e. the rate at which oxidized and reduced species transfer electrons with the electrode.  In other words, the exchange current density is the rate of reaction at the reversible potential (when the overpotential is zero by definition).  At the reversible potential, the reaction is in equilibrium meaning that the forward and reverse reactions progress at the same rates. This rate is the exchange current density.

The Tafel slope is measured experimentally.  It can, however, be shown theoretically that when the dominant reaction mechanism involves the transfer of a single electron that

where A is defined as 

where
 
  is Boltzmann's constant,
  is the absolute temperature, 
  is the electric elementary charge of an electron,
  is the thermal voltage, and 
  is the "charge transfer coefficient", the value of which must be between 0 and 1.

Equation in case of non-negligible electrode mass transfer
In a more general case, " The following derivation of the extended Butler-Volmer equation is adapted from that of Bard and Faulkner and Newman and Thomas-Alyea".

" [ ... ]  the current is expressed as a function not only of potential (as in the simple version), but of the given concentrations as well. The mass-transfer rate may be relatively small, but its only effect on the chemical reaction is through the altered (given) concentrations. In effect, the concentrations are a function of the potential as well ".The Tafel equation can be also written as:

where
 n is the number of electrons exchanged, like in the Nernst equation,
 k is the rate constant for the electrode reaction in s−1,
 F is the Faraday constant,
 C is the reactive species concentration at the electrode surface in mol/m2,
 the plus sign under the exponent refers to an anodic reaction, and a minus sign to a cathodic reaction,
 R is the universal gas constant.
  is the "charge transfer coefficient", the value of which must be between 0 and 1.

Demonstration 
As seen in equation,

 so:

 as seen in equation and because .
 because 
due to the electrode mass transfer  , which finally yields equation.

Equation in case of low values of polarization 
An other equation is applicable at low values of polarization . In such case, the dependence of current on polarization is usually linear (not logarithmic):

This linear region is called polarization resistance due to its formal similarity to Ohm's law.

See also
Overpotential
Butler–Volmer equation
Electrocatalyst
Faradaic current
Faraday's laws of electrolysis

References

Further reading

External links
 

Chemical kinetics
Electrochemical equations
Physical chemistry